Happy State of Mind is a studio album by American country singer-songwriter Bill Anderson. It was released in September 1968 on Decca Records and was produced by Owen Bradley. Anderson's tenth studio recording, it was also his second studio album released in 1968. Among the songs included on the release was the title track, which became a major hit in both the United States and Canada.

Background and content
Happy State of Mind was recorded in August 1968 at Bradley's Barn, a studio located in Mount Juliet, Tennessee. The sessions were supervised by Owen Bradley, Anderson's long time producer. The record's production marked Anderson's tenth studio album to be recorded. The album contained 11 tracks. Six of the album's tracks were composed by Anderson, including the title track. Happy State of Mind also included cover versions of songs previously recorded by other performers. The third track on side two of the record was a cover of Merle Haggard's "Today I Started Loving You Again". "Did She Mention My Name" was previously written and recorded by Canadian folk artist Gordon Lightfoot. Another album track, "The Unicorn" was first cut by The Irish Rovers. Although not a cover, "I Still Believe in Love", would later be recorded by Jan Howard in 1969 and released as a single.

Release and reception
Happy State of Mind was released in September 1968 on Decca Records. It was issued as a vinyl record, with five songs on side one and six songs on side two. The album peaked at number 24 on the Billboard Top Country Albums chart in November 1968 after spending 11 weeks on the list. The record's title track was the only single issued. It was released in July 1968 and peaked at number two on the Billboard Hot Country Songs chart in October 1968. The single also became his first to chart on the RPM Country Songs chart in Canada, where it reached number one. The album would later be reviewed from Allmusic who gave it 2.5 out of 5 possible stars.

Track listing

Personnel
All credits are adapted from the liner notes of Happy State of Mind.

Musical personnel
 Bill Anderson – lead vocals
 Harold Bradley – guitar
 Ray Edenton – guitar
 Roy Huskey – bass
 The Jordanaires – background vocals
 Jimmy Lance – guitar
 Grady Martin – guitar
 Len Miller – drums
 Hal Rugg – steel guitar
 Jerry Smith – piano

Technical personnel
 Owen Bradley – record producer
 Hal Buksbaum – photography

Chart performance

Release history

References

1968 albums
Albums produced by Owen Bradley
Bill Anderson (singer) albums
Decca Records albums